The Radisson Blu Al Mahary Hotel Tripoli is a modern tourist hotel in Tripoli, Libya, near Grand Hotel Tripoli.

Data & History

It was built in 1989 and completely remodeled in 2009 to international standards as part of Radisson Hotels.

It is located on the site of the earlier Italian Hotel del Mehari , built in 1935 at the same time as the nearby Hotel Casinò Uaddan.

Like the Uaddan, it was designed by Italian architect Florestano Di Fausto, with the collaboration of Stefano Gatti-Casazza. According to Brian McLaren in his book Architecture and tourism in Italian colonial Libya, the destroyed Mehari hotel "provided a fusion of the indigenous architecture of Tripoli with a modern aesthetic that responded to the demand for a metropolitan standard of comfort, typical to colonial tourism.

See also
 Grand Hotel Tripoli
 Hotel Casinò Uaddan

References

External links
the "Grand Hotel" in Italian Tripoli

Hotels in Tripoli, Libya
Hotels established in 1989
Hotel buildings completed in 1989